Rooftop Moonlight (Hangul: 옥상달빛; also known as Okdal) is a South Korean duo formed by Magic Strawberry Sound in Seoul, South Korea. They debuted on January 22, 2010, with Okdal Radio.

Career 
Rooftop Moonlight was formed when they were students of video music composition at Dong-ah Institute of Media and Arts and has been performing since 2008 with the modern rock club. By participating in the third album of Old Fish, the two took their first step toward becoming musicians.

Later, while receiving attention for winning the 19th Yoo Jae-ha Music Competition, documentary and film music participation, it became widely known for its song "Rooftop Moonlight," which was inserted in the drama Pasta.

Since their official debut in the music industry with EP album "Rooftop Radio" in 2010, they have gained popularity with reviews that they express the sensibilities of contemporary youth in detail.

On 26 April 2011, they released their first album, 28. With the title track "None The Better Or Courage," they showed more arrangements and compositions than EPs. In the same year, they successfully sold out their first solo performance, "merit of solo," on June 3–5.

Members
 Kim Yoon-ju (김윤주) – vocal, keyboard, guitar
 Park Se-jin (박세진) – vocal, melodica, xylophone

Discography

Studio albums

Extended plays

Single albums

Singles

Collaborations

Soundtrack appearances

Other appearances

Notes

References

Musical groups from Seoul
Musical groups established in 2010
2010 establishments in South Korea
South Korean musical duos